United Nations Security Council Resolution 382, adopted unanimously on December 1, 1975, after examining the application of Suriname for membership in the United Nations, the Council recommended to the General Assembly that Suriname be admitted.

See also
 List of United Nations Security Council Resolutions 301 to 400 (1971–1976)

References
Text of the Resolution at undocs.org

External links
 

 0382
 0382
 0382
1975 in Suriname
December 1975 events